The 1901–02 season was the eighth in the history of the Southern League. Portsmouth were Division One champions for the first time. No clubs applied for election to the Football League.

Division One

A total of 16 teams contest the division, including 13 sides from previous season and three new teams.

Team promoted from Division Two:
 Brentford
Teams elected from Midland League:
 Northampton Town
 Wellingborough

Division Two

A total of nine teams contest the division, including 7 sides from previous season and two new teams.

Newly elected teams:
 Brighton & Hove Albion
 West Hampstead.

Promotion-relegation test matches
At the end of the season, test matches were held between the bottom two clubs in Division One and the top two clubs in Division Two. Swindon Town beat Fulham 3–0 to maintain their place in Division One. The other match between Brentford and Grays United ended in a 1–1 draw, but for a second successive season Grays were refused promotion after refusing to play extra time.

References

External links 
Southern League First Division Tables at RSSSF
Southern League Second Division Tables at RSSSF

1901-02
1901–02 in English association football leagues